Mount Saint Nicholas is a peak in the remote southwestern section of Glacier National Park, in Montana. It is a particularly steep, pointed rock pinnacle, and its distinctive profile is visible from many summits in the southern half of the park. Because even its easiest ascent route is technical, with poor rock quality, it is "considered the most dangerous and difficult mountain for climbers in Glacier National Park."

Mount Saint Nicholas excels in terms of steep vertical relief, even by the high standards prevalent in Glacier National Park. For example, its northwest face rises one vertical mile (5,280 ft/1,609 m) in approximately 1.5 horizontal miles (7,920 ft/2.4 km). Due to its pointed shape and isolation from the Continental Divide, it has similarly precipitous drops in all directions.

In 1926, Reverend Conrad Wellen of Havre, Montana made the first ascent of Mount Saint Nicholas. The mountain had previously been considered by many to be unclimbable. The standard route is the Northeast Ridge. Starting from the east side of the peak, this route begins with a straightforward scramble up a gully to a prominent notch. From the notch a thousand vertical feet of somewhat technical climbing remain.

Geology

Like other mountains in Glacier National Park, the peak is composed of sedimentary rock laid down during the Precambrian to Jurassic periods.

Climate
Based on the Köppen climate classification, the peak is located in an alpine subarctic climate zone with long, cold, snowy winters, and cool to warm summers. Temperatures can drop below −10 °F with wind chill factors below −30 °F.

See also
 List of mountains and mountain ranges of Glacier National Park

References

External links
 Mount Saint Nicholas on TopoQuest

Mountains of Flathead County, Montana
Mountains of Glacier National Park (U.S.)
Lewis Range
Mountains of Montana